Kevin Moreno (born 23 July 2000) is a Colombian football player who plays as defender for Deportivo Cali in Categoría Primera A.

References

2000 births
Living people
Colombian footballers
Colombia youth international footballers
Categoría Primera A players
Deportivo Cali footballers
Association football defenders
Footballers from Cali